Eldor Shomurodov (Uzbek Latin: Eldor Azamat oʻgʻli Shomurodov; Russian: Эльдор Шомуродов; (born 29 June 1995) is an Uzbek professional footballer who plays as a striker for  club Spezia, on loan from Roma. He also captains the Uzbekistan national team.

Club career

Mash'al Mubarek 
Shomurodov started his career at Mash'al Mubarek in 2011, playing for youth team of the club. He played for Mash'al from 2011 to 2014. Shomurodov made his official debut for the main team in the Uzbek League on 12 April 2014, in an away match against Olmaliq. He played nine games for the club during the 2014 season.

Bunyodkor 
In 2015, he signed a contract with Bunyodkor. He played 19 matches and scored 7 goals in the league (as of 1 October 2015).

Rostov 
On 15 July 2017, Bunyodkor announced that Shomurodov was moving to Russian Premier League club Rostov.

Genoa 
On 1 October 2020, he moved to Serie A club Genoa. By doing so, he became the second Uzbek footballer to play in Italy, after Ilyos Zeytulayev.

Roma 
On 2 August 2021, Roma announced the acquisition of Shomurodov on a five-year contract for €17.5 million plus bonuses. He debuted 17 days later in José Mourinho's first game as manager, away to Trabzonspor in the first leg of the UEFA Europa Conference League playoffs. He started the game and scored the decisive goal of a 2–1 win. He went on to become the first-ever Uzbek football player to win a major UEFA competition, as his club triumphed in the 2022 UEFA Europa Conference League Final.

Spezia 
On 30 January 2023, Spezia announced the signing of Shomurodov on loan from Roma until the end of the season.

International career

Youth 
Shomurodov played for the Uzbekistan U19 in the 2014 AFC U-19 Championship and qualified to 2015 FIFA U-20 World Cup. He played in all five matches of U-20 team at the 2015 U-20 World Cup and scored two goals.

Shomurodov and two teammates were listed as nominees for best young players of Asia by AFC in 2015.

Senior 
Shomurodov was called to senior national team to play on 3 September 2015 in 2018 World Cup qualifying match against Yemen. He made his official debut in that match. On 8 October 2015, he scored his first goal for the national team in a World Cup qualifying away match against Bahrain, securing a 4–0 victory for the Uzbek side.

Shomurodov was part of the squad that manager Héctor Cúper took to the 2019 AFC Asian Cup in the United Arab Emirates. He came off the bench to score a late winner in a 2–1 opening victory over Oman, and followed it by scoring twice in a 4–0 win over neighbours Turkmenistan as a starter. In the last group game, he opened a 2–1 loss to Japan as both teams progressed.

Style of play 
Shomurodov is a striker capable of both scoring and providing assists and who can vary across the offensive front. Shomurodov is capable of strong accelerations and progressions on the run, he is also physically strong, he can attack space, has good dynamism and is skilled in aerial play.

For his quality his nicknamed "the Uzbek Messi".

Career statistics

Club

International

Scores and results list Uzbekistan's goal tally first, score column indicates score after each Shomurodov goal.

Honours 
Mash'al
 UzPFL Cup: 2014

Roma
 UEFA Europa Conference League: 2021–22

Individual
 Uzbekistan Player of the Year: 2019, 2021

References

External links 

 
 Profile at Russian Premier League
 

1995 births
Living people
People from Surxondaryo Region
Uzbekistani footballers
Association football forwards
FC Bunyodkor players
FC Rostov players
Genoa C.F.C. players
A.S. Roma players
Spezia Calcio players
Uzbekistan Super League players
Russian Premier League players
Serie A players
Uzbekistan youth international footballers
Uzbekistan international footballers
2019 AFC Asian Cup players
Uzbekistani expatriate footballers
Uzbekistani expatriate sportspeople in Russia
Uzbekistani expatriate sportspeople in Italy
Expatriate footballers in Russia
Expatriate footballers in Italy
UEFA Europa Conference League winning players